Laurel Fork North Wilderness is a U.S. Wilderness Area located in the Greenbrier Ranger District of Monongahela National Forest in West Virginia.  The Wilderness protects high-elevation lands along Laurel Fork (Cheat River) and is bordered by Middle Mountain to the west.  It is a companion to Laurel Fork South Wilderness, the two being split by Randolph County Route 40.  Laurel Fork North contains  of hiking trails.

History
The land that now comprises Laurel Fork North Wilderness was once private forestland owned by the Laurel River Lumber Company.  The area was first logged by floating the logs down the Laurel Fork, and later by railroad.  By 1921, the virgin forestland was fully logged.  The U.S. Forest Service acquired the area soon thereafter, adding it to Monongahela National Forest.

Laurel Fork South and Laurel Fork North Wildernesses were designated in 1983 by the Monongahela National Forest, West Virginia, Land Designations law.

See also
Laurel Fork South Wilderness
Laurel Fork
Monongahela National Forest

References

IUCN Category Ib
Monongahela National Forest
Protected areas of Randolph County, West Virginia
Wilderness areas of West Virginia
Protected areas established in 1983
1983 establishments in West Virginia